Two ships of Clan Line were named Clan Mackinlay.

Ship names